Subulicystidium is a genus of corticioid fungi in the family Hydnodontaceae. The genus has a widespread distribution, and contains seven species.

References

Trechisporales
Trechisporales genera